Cristoforo Ciocca (1462–1542) was an Italian painter of the late-Renaissance, active in Milan. Little biographical information is known, except that he was the pupil of Gian Paolo Lomazzo. He painted a San Cristoforo altarpiece for the church of San Vittore al Corpo, Milan . He mainly painted sacred subjects and portraits.

References

1462 births
1542 deaths
15th-century Italian painters
Italian male painters
16th-century Italian painters
Painters from Milan
Italian Renaissance painters